Glasgow Central is one of two principal mainline rail terminals in Glasgow, Scotland. The railway station was opened by the Caledonian Railway on 1 August 1879 and is one of 20 managed by Network Rail. It is the northern terminus of the West Coast Main Line ( north of London Euston). As well as being Glasgow's principal inter-city terminus for services to England, Central also serves the southern suburbs of the Greater Glasgow conurbation, as well as the Ayrshire and Clyde coasts.

With just under 33 million passengers in 2017–18, Glasgow Central is the twelfth-busiest railway station in Britain and the busiest in Scotland. According to Network Rail, over 38 million people use it annually, 80% of whom are passengers. The station is protected as a category A listed building.

In Britain's 100 Best Railway Stations by Simon Jenkins, the station was one of only ten to be awarded five stars. In 2017, the station received a customer satisfaction score of 95.2%, the highest in the UK.

Original station
The original station, opened on 1 August 1879 on the north bank of the River Clyde, had eight platforms and was linked to Bridge Street station by a railway bridge over Argyle Street and a four-track railway bridge, built by Sir William Arrol, which crossed the Clyde to the south. The station was built over the site of Grahamston village, whose central street (Alston Street) was demolished to make way for the station platform.

The station was soon congested. In 1890, a temporary solution of widening the bridge over Argyle Street and inserting a ninth platform on Argyle Street bridge was completed. It was also initially intended to increase Bridge Street station to eight through lines and to increase Central station to 13 platforms.

Low-level station
The low-level platforms were originally a two-island separate station, and were added to serve the underground Glasgow Central Railway, authorised on 10 August 1888 and opened on 10 August 1896. The Glasgow Central Railway was taken over by the Caledonian Railway in 1890. Other stations include Cambuslang and Motherwell.

1901–1905 station rebuild

By 1900 the station was again found to be too small, passenger numbers per annum on the high-level station having increased by 5.156 million since the first extension was completed in 1890. Passenger usage per annum in 1899 was 16.841 million on the high-level station and 6.416 million on the low-level station, a total of 23.257 million. The station is on two levels: the High-Level station at the same level as Gordon Street, which bridges over Argyle Street, and the underground Low-Level station.

Between 1901 and 1905 the original station was rebuilt. The station was extended over the top of Argyle Street, and thirteen platforms were built. An additional eight-track bridge, the Caledonian Railway Bridge, was built over the Clyde, and the original bridge was raised by 30 inches (0.75 m). Bridge Street station was then closed.

Also during the 1901–1905 rebuild a series of sidings was created at the end of Platforms 11 and 12 on the bridge over the River Clyde. These were named West Bank Siding, Mid Bank Siding and East Bank Siding. A dock siding – No. 14 Dock was created at the south end of Platform 13.

Central Station has a spacious concourse containing shops, catering outlets, ticket offices and a travel centre. It is fronted by the Central Hotel on Gordon Street, designed by Robert Rowand Anderson. The station building also houses a long line of shops and bars down the Union Street side. The undercroft of the station is not open to the general public, except through regular official tours, and houses private car-parking and utility functions for the station and the adjoining Central Hotel.

The station's famous architectural features are the large glass-walled bridge that takes the station building over Argyle Street, nicknamed the 'Hielanman's Umbrella' (Highlandman's Umbrella) because it was used as a meeting place for highlanders living in the city; and the former ticket office and information building. This was a large oval building, with the booking office on the ground floor and the train information display for passengers on large printed cloth destination boards placed behind large windows on the first floor by a team of two men. Underneath the "Umbrella" are a number of shops and bars. The former nightclub, theatre, gallery and restaurant complex, The Arches, was also located below the station.

Central Hotel

Central Station is fronted by the Central Hotel on Gordon Street. Adjoining onto the station concourse, it was one of Glasgow's most prestigious hotels in its heyday.

It was originally designed by Robert Rowand Anderson, in 'Queen Anne style'; he also furnished the public rooms. The hotel was completed in 1883, but was extended along with the station in 1901–1906. The hotel extension was designed by James Miller and it opened on 15 April 1907.

The world's first long-distance television pictures were transmitted to the Central Hotel in the station, on 24 May 1927 by John Logie Baird. The hotel was sold by British Rail in the 1980s, and passed through the hands of various private operators until its most recent owner, the Real Hotel Group, went into administration in February 2009, and the hotel subsequently closed amid concerns of asbestos contamination and structural deterioration.

In June 2009, a new company acquired the hotel building, and worked to refurbish and rebrand it as the Glasgow Grand Central Hotel. The refurbished hotel re-opened in September 2010. In 2021 it was refurbished by IHG Hotels & Resorts and rebranded voco Grand Central Hotel.

Signalling

The original 1889 signal box was replaced with an electro-pneumatic power-operated box based on the Westinghouse system. Work started in October 1907 and it opened on 5 April 1908. It was built directly over the River Clyde, sitting between the two river bridges, above the level of the tracks. Inside was a frame of 374 miniature levers, making it the longest power frame ever built in Great Britain.

Glasgow Central Signalling Centre, located in the "vee" of Bridge Street Junction, opened on 2 January 1961. It replaced signal boxes at Central Station, Bridge Street Junction, Eglinton Street Junction and Eglinton Street Station. When initially opened it was capable of handling 1,000 routes.

The new signalling centre was needed for three reasons:

 The 1907 power signal box was worn out;
 The original 1879 bridge over the River Clyde was coming to the end of its useful life, and it was more effective to use the newer (1904) bridge to handle all the traffic, with the lines signalled bi-directionally;
 Electrification of the Cathcart Circle Lines, and subsequently the Gourock and Wemyss Bay services and the West Coast Main Line.

In addition to the removal of the east river bridge, the scissor crossovers through the station, the Cathcart Engine siding, East Bank Siding, Mid Bank Siding and No. 14 Dock were removed. The West Bank Siding was numbered as Platform 11a.

Glasgow Central Signalling Centre closed on 27 December 2008, when its area of control was transferred to the new West of Scotland Signalling Centre (WSSC) at Cowlairs. The NX panel is to be preserved. The station is currently signalled by two Westinghouse Westlock Interlockings which are controlled via an Alstom MCS control system.

Railway electrification

Overhead power lines began to appear on the high-level platforms in the early 1960s under British Railways. Firstly came 6.25 kV AC overhead power lines from the Cathcart Circle Line electrification scheme, which started on 29 May 1962. During this period, the old 1879 bridge over the River Clyde was removed and the railway lines were rearranged.

This was followed by the 25 kV AC overhead-power-lines electrification of the Glasgow and Paisley Joint Railway and the Inverclyde Line to Gourock and Wemyss Bay, completed in 1967. The WCML northern electrification scheme started on 6 May 1974. Part of the Cathcart Circle was upgraded to 25 kV AC supply in 1974, to provide a diversionary route; the whole of the Cathcart Circle route was later upgraded to that supply.

Plans to electrify other routes, such as the Whifflet Line, as part of a scheme to improve rail services in Scotland were completed in November 2014.

Late-20th century developments

Low-level station

Closure
Services through the Low-Level station, initially generous, had been greatly reduced due to competition with the extensive and efficient Glasgow Corporation tram system well before their withdrawal on 3 October 1964 under the "Beeching Axe". The trams themselves had been replaced by buses by 1962.

Re-opening
In 1979, part of the low-level line was electrified and the Low-Level station was re-opened as the Argyle Line of the Glasgow suburban railway network. It consisted of a single island platform, numbered as Platforms 14 and 15 (later renumbered to 16 and 17 respectively when the project to re-signal and add two additional platforms to the higher level took place in 2008).

Initially services were provided by Class 303 and Class 314 units. The latter were built specifically for this service. Following the withdrawal of the Class 303 units, the service was provided by Class 318 and Class 334 "Juniper" units.

Class 320 units were intended to be used on the route, but due to the position of the original driver's monitors for checking doors, this proved impossible. Therefore, these units were restricted to the North Clyde Line.  This changed in 2011 with a programme of works carried out to enable the Class 320 units to work through the station in passenger service. The class 320 and 318 units between them now provide the majority of Argyle Line services, with most 334s having moved to operate the Airdrie-Bathgate Rail Link.

Flooding of the Low-Level line
It was closed until 24 September 1995 while repairs were made.

Most services were routed to the high-level platforms, or to Queen Street station. The 2002 Glasgow floods had a number of other effects, causing a cryptospiridium outbreak in Glasgow's water supply.

1980s redevelopment

The high-level station's facilities were substantially redeveloped in the mid-1980s. The old ticket office / train information building was replaced in 1985 by an all-new Travel Centre adjacent to the Gordon Street entrance. By 1986 a large electro-mechanical destination board at the end of the platforms, with a smaller repeater board at the western side of the concourse, had replaced the former manually operated train-information boards. The old booking office / train information building was retained and redeveloped into shops, eateries and an upstairs bar/restaurant, and the station was re-floored in marble.

During this redevelopment the staffed ticket barriers at Platforms 1 to 8 were removed and the yellow ticket automatic barriers were removed from Platforms 9 to 13 (now 15).

1998–2005 refurbishment

In 1998, a five-year renovation programme was initiated by Railtrack, which saw the trainshed completely re-roofed and internally refurbished by Bovis Lend Lease – which also included the restoration of Hielanman's Umbrella.  The 1980s vintage mechanical pixel-style destination boards were later replaced around 2005 with an array of LED-style destination boards. The final improvement, the upgrading of the upstairs restaurant area, was completed in 2005.

21st century developments

Layout
Platform 1 is at the east end and platform 15 is located at the west end of the station with platforms 16 and 17 being directly underneath the station's high level platforms. Platforms 1 and 2 are usually used by longer distance cross-border services operated by Avanti West Coast, TransPennine Express, LNER and CrossCountry while platforms 3 to 6 are used mainly by services to Lanark, Edinburgh, East Kilbride, Barrhead, Kilmarnock, Carlisle, Girvan, and Stranraer. Platforms 7–10 are used by services which operate along the Cathcart Circle and also Neilston and Newton, but other services are known to use them as well, while platforms 11–15 are used mostly by services to Ayr, Largs, Ardrossan, Gourock, Wemyss Bay and Paisley Canal, with platform 11 being used as a relief platform for Avanti West Coast services if platforms 1 or 2 cannot be used.

2009/10 expansion

To accommodate the cancelled Glasgow Airport Rail Link plans, the platforms were renumbered. Platform 11a (the previous West Bank Siding, on the bridge over the Clyde) was renumbered 12, whilst 12 & 13 were renumbered 14 & 15 respectively. In September 2009 the former platform-level car park and passenger drop-off area was taken out of use and the platform over the Clyde (recently renumbered 12) was removed. Two new platforms were created between 11 and 14, being brought into use in May 2010. There is no plan to replace indoor parking or passenger drop-off within Central station. The existing multi-storey parking facility on Oswald Street and on-street parking surrounding Central station remain, with passenger drop-off having moved to surrounding streets. During Cyclone Bodil in December 2013, the glass roof of the station was broken by flying debris.

Barriers
Automatic ticket barriers were installed at Glasgow Central and three other city-centre stations from 2011 as part of a crackdown on fare-dodging to increase ticket revenue. This follows barriers being erected at Queen Street Station in 2004, ending ScotRail's "open stations" policy under which staffed and previous yellow ticket automatic barriers had been scrapped during the 1980s to encourage more passengers; tickets were checked on trains instead. ScotRail finalised negotiations with Network Rail over the project in June 2010, with the project completed in February 2012, covering High Level Platforms 3 to 15 and Low Level Platforms 16 and 17. Platforms 1 and 2 were left without barriers, as they are mostly used by long-distance express services with a high proportion of passengers carrying heavy luggage.

Station tours 
Following the success of the doors open day event in summer 2013, tours of the station several times each week began in November 2014. These 90-minute tours cover the roof, plus the catacombs, vaults, and a view of disused platforms below the station.

Piano garden 
In December 2017, McLaren's Pianos gave a piano to the station on permanent loan which is available to the public to play. This area is referred to as the "Piano Garden" and is located directly behind the mobility assistance booth.

Station ticket facilities 
There are three ticket halls. Two are operated by ScotRail (main concourse and Argyle Street entrance) and the third is a travel centre run by Avanti West Coast at the Gordon Street entrance. Avanti West Coast also operate a dedicated customer lounge next to Platform 1 and a First Class lounge.

Services 
As of 2022, Glasgow Central is served by six train-operating companies. Scotrail uses both the high level and low level platforms, all other operators use only the high level.

A taxi rank is to the north of the station, while buses operate from the adjacent streets. St Enoch and Buchanan Street Subway stations are within a few minutes' walk.

Service Pattern 
Service pattern for Monday-Friday off-peak in trains per hour (tph)/trains per day (tpd).

ScotRail: 
High Level:

 2 tph to Lanark via Motherwell and Wishaw
 1 tph to Newton via Pollokshields East and Mount Florida
 1 tph to Newton via Pollokshields West and Pollokshaws East
 2 tph to Neilston via Mount Florida and Cathcart
 1 tph to Edinburgh Waverley via Shotts and Wester Hailes
 1 tp2h to Edinburgh Waverley via Motherwell and Carstairs
 2 tph to Paisley Canal via Mosspark
 1 tph to Gourock (fast) via Paisley Gilmour Street and Port Glasgow
 2 tph to Gourock (slow) via Paisley Gilmour Street, Paisley St James, and Port Glasgow
 1 tph to Wemyss Bay via Paisley Gilmour Street and Port Glasgow
 2 tph to Ayr (fast) via Kilwinning and Prestwick International Airport
 2 tph to Ayr (slow) via Paisley Gilmour Street, Kilwinning and Prestwick International Airport
 1 tph to Ardrossan Harbour via Paisley Gilmour Street and Ardrossan Town
 1 tph to Largs via Paisley Gilmour Street and West Kilbride
 2 tph to East Kilbride via Pollokshaws West and Busby (of which 1tph calls at Thorntonhall)
 1 tph to Barrhead via Pollokshaws West
 1 tp2h to Kilmarnock (fast) via Barrhead (of which 1 tpd continues to Ayr and 1tpd continues to Girvan)
 1 tph to Kilmarnock (slow) via Pollokshaws West and Barrhead
 1 tp2h to Carlisle via Barrhead, Kilmarnock and Dumfries

Low Level:

 2 tph to Larkhall via Newton and Hamilton Central
 1 tph to Cumbernauld via Hamilton Central and Motherwell
 1 tph to Motherwell via Newton and Hamilton Central
 1 tph to Motherwell via Mount Vernon and Whifflet
 1 tph to Whifflet via Mount Vernon
 2 tph to Dalmuir via Anniesland and Singer
 4 tph to Dalmuir via Yoker and Clydebank

During the temporary closure of Glasgow Queen Street High Level Station in 2016, services to Inverness/Aberdeen via Dundee and Perth were diverted to Glasgow Central.

Avanti West Coast 

 1 tph to London Euston via Preston and Warrington Bank Quay (trains alternate between calls at Penrith and Oxenholme Lake District at 1 tp2h each)
 4 tpd to London Euston (slow) via Preston, Warrington Bank Quay and Birmingham New Street

CrossCountry 

 1 tpd to Plymouth via Edinburgh Waverley, York, Birmingham New Street and Bristol Temple Meads
 1 tpd to York via Edinburgh Waverley and Newcastle
 1 tpd to Edinburgh Waverley

TransPennine Express (No service weekends) 

 4 tpd to Manchester Airport via Preston and Manchester Piccadilly
 1 tpd to Liverpool Lime Street via Preston and St Helens Central
 1 tpd to Preston via Carlisle

London North Eastern Railway 

 1tpd to London Kings Cross via Edinburgh Waverley and York (Except Sunday)

Caledonian Sleeper 

 1tpd to London Euston via Preston (except Saturday night)

Inside Central Station (BBC Scotland TV series)

Coinciding with the launch of the new BBC Scotland TV Channel, a new documentary TV series titled Inside Central Station was commissioned to STV Productions, first airing on 3 March 2019 detailing the day-to-day life of the station following and interviewing various members of staff on their shifts and passengers visiting the station. The series also focused on the history of the station, with segments presented by the station tour guide, Paul Lyons. The series received positive critical reception and has been recommissioned for future series.

References

Notes

Sources

 

 
 
 
 
 
 
 History of Glasgow Central station

Further reading

External links 

 

Railway stations in Glasgow
Former Caledonian Railway stations
Railway stations in Great Britain opened in 1879 
Railway stations in Great Britain opened in 1896 
Railway stations in Great Britain closed in 1964
Railway stations in Great Britain opened in 1979
Network Rail managed stations
SPT railway stations
Railway stations served by ScotRail
Railway stations served by Caledonian Sleeper
Railway stations served by CrossCountry
Railway stations served by TransPennine Express
Railway stations served by Avanti West Coast
Railway stations served by London North Eastern Railway
Category A listed buildings in Glasgow
Listed railway stations in Scotland
James Miller railway stations
Robert Rowand Anderson buildings
Stations on the West Coast Main Line